Amrita Vishwa Vidyapeetham (or Amrita University) is a private deemed university based in Coimbatore, India. It currently has 7 campuses with 16 constituent schools across the Indian states of Tamil Nadu, Kerala, Andhra Pradesh and Karnataka with the headquarters at Ettimadai, Coimbatore, Tamil Nadu. It offers a total of 207 undergraduate, postgraduate, integrated-degree, dual-degree, doctoral programs in engineering and technology, medicine, business, arts and culture, sciences, biotechnology, agricultural sciences, allied health sciences, Ayurveda, dentistry, pharmacy, nursing, nano-sciences, commerce, humanities and social sciences, law, literature, spiritual studies, philosophy, education, sustainable development, mass communication and social work.

History 
The university was founded with the opening of Amrita School of Engineering, Coimbatore in 1994 by Mata Amritanandamayi Devi and is managed by her international humanitarian organisation Mata Amritanandamayi Math. In 2003, it became one of the youngest institutes to be accredited as a deemed to be university by the UGC. In 2002, campuses in Amritapuri and Bangalore were started.

Campuses 

The university has six campuses, with 15 constituent schools in rural and urban sites in four south Indian states – Tamil Nadu, Kerala, and Karnataka. The first to be established was the Coimbatore campus in 1994, with the opening of Amrita School of Engineering at Ettimadai, a village about 20 km east of Coimbatore. Amrita Institute of Medical Sciences (AIMS) in Edapally, Kochi was inaugurated on 17 May 1998 by the then Prime Minister, Atal Bihari Vajpayee. Later in 2002, two campuses were opened, one urban campus at Bengaluru, and one rural campus in Amritapuri village, which also hosts the headquarters of the Mata Amritanandamayi Math that runs the university. In 2019, an engineering campus was opened at Chennai. Currently, two new healthcare campuses are being constructed at Faridabad, Haryana and Amaravati, Andhra Pradesh.

Amrita Schools

Amrita Schools of Arts, Sciences and Humanities
The schools of Arts and Sciences offer Bachelor of Commerce, Bachelor of Business Administration (BBA), Bachelor of Computer Applications (BCA), Master of Computer Applications (MCA) programs  and are located at Amritapuri, Kochi, Mysore.
Bachelor of Science in Visual Media (B.Sc.), Integrated M.Sc. in Visual Communication, Master of Science in Visual Communication (M.Sc.), Master of Arts in Journalism and Mass Communication and Master of Arts in Visual Media and Communication (M.A) programs are currently offered at Mysore campus.

Amrita Schools of Business

The school of Business was started in 1996 in Coimbatore campus and currently 4 campuses - Coimbatore, Bangalore, Kochi, Amritapuri (Kollam). The school offers AACSB accredited residential two-year MBA degree program. In addition, it offers a dual degree program leading to an MS in information technology and MBA in collaboration with State University of New York at Buffalo, for working professionals at the Bangalore campus.

Amrita School of Biotechnology
The school was started in September 2004 and offers B.Sc. and M.Sc. in Biotechnology, B.Sc. and M.Sc. in Microbiology, and M.Sc. in Bioinformatics, as well as Ph.D. degree programs. Its research spans a wide spectrum including Cell Biology, Molecular Biology, Cancer Biology, Cell-line Engineering, Wound Healing, Computational Neuroscience, Neurophysiology, Phytochemistry, Biomedical Engineering, Proteomics, RNAi, Analytical Chemistry, Snake Venoms, Sanitation Biotechnology.

The Amrita School of Biotechnology is approved as a Center of Relevance and Excellence (CORE) in Biomedical Technology under the Department of Science and Technology, Government of India, TIFAC Mission REACH programs. The School of Biotechnology was selected by the DBT-BIRAC (Government of India) and the Bill & Melinda Gates Foundation as one of the top six innovators in India to develop next generation sanitation solutions using bacteriophages and other biocontrol agents.

Amrita School of Communication
The school offers B.A. and M.A. degree programs in Communication for careers in journalism, new media/animation, and short film making and advertising, based on the UNESCO model curriculum.

Amrita Schools of Engineering

The university has schools of engineering in four of its six campuses, and offers undergraduate, post-graduate and doctoral programs in fields of Computer science and engineering, Electronics and Communication engineering, Electrical and electronic engineering, Information and communications technology, Artificial intelligence, Mechanical engineering, Civil engineering, Chemical engineering and Aerospace engineering. The Amrita School of Engineering, Coimbatore was opened in 1994 and predates the deemed university by 7 years.  Other campuses include Bengaluru, Amritapuri, Chennai and Amaravati. Admission to B.Tech. programs are based on Amrita Engineering Entrance Exam (AEEE), SAT, Pearson UEE and JEE Main. Admission to the MTech. Programs are based on the Graduate Aptitude Test in Engineering(GATE).

The five schools offer B.Tech., MTech. and Ph.D. degree programs and the Kochi campus offers MTech. in Nanomedicine, Molecular Medicine and Nanotechnology and Renewable Energy.

Amrita Health Campuses
Attached to the Amrita Institute of Medical Sciences and Research Centre is a 1300-bed super-specialty hospital in Kochi.  It is the university's healthcare initial campus. A second medical school and 2,000 bed hospital campus was set up in Delhi on 9 May 2016. The Amrita Schools of Medicine, Dept. of Hospital Administration provide MHA (Masters in Hospital Administration), health sciences, nursing, pharmacy, and dentistry are on this campus. They respectively offer MBBS, Bachelor of Science (Nursing), undergraduate/graduate pharmacy programs, and Bachelor of Dental Surgery degree programs.

The School of Medicine offers graduate programs including M.Sc. in disciplines, Diplomate of National Board (DNB), and PhD. In 2008, the first batch of MBBS students graduated with A. P. J. Abdul Kalam presiding over the graduation ceremony.

Notable alumni
 Muhammed Muhsin, Politician - Communist Party of India
 Lijomol Jose, Indian actress
 RJ Balaji, Indian RJ and commentator
 Kailash Satyarthi, Indian social campaigner

References

External links

 

Medical colleges in Karnataka
Medical colleges in Kochi
Medical colleges in Tamil Nadu
Educational institutions established in 1994
All India Council for Technical Education
Universities and colleges affiliated with the Mata Amritanandamayi Math
Deemed universities in Tamil Nadu
1994 establishments in Tamil Nadu
Engineering colleges in Tamil Nadu
Deemed universities in India
Engineering colleges in Kochi
Engineering colleges in Karnataka
Engineering colleges in Andhra Pradesh